Sappho was launched in Whitby in 1813, and moved her registration to London in 1814. Thereafter she traded widely. She made a voyage to Bombay and one to Bengal, sailing under a licence from the British East India Company (EIC). She was last listed in 1833.

Career
Sappho first appeared in the Register of Shipping (RS) in 1813. Missing pages in the online 1814 volume of Lloyd's Register (LR) mean that she first appeared in the 1815 online volume. 

In 1813 the EIC had lost its monopoly on the trade between India and Britain. British ships were then free to sail to India or the Indian Ocean under a licence from the EIC.

On 30 March 1817 Sappho, C.Hall, master, sailed for Bombay, under a license from the EIC.

On 10 September 1819, Sappho, F.G.Stewart, sailed for Fort William, (Calcutta).

Fate
Sappho was last listed in 1833.

Citations and references
Citations

References
 
 

1813 ships
Ships built in Whitby
Age of Sail merchant ships of England